Yukon News is one of two newspapers published in Whitehorse, Yukon in Canada.  It
was founded in 1960, as a weekly until the late 1970s. It
currently prints two times a week. Its Monday edition is online-only. The Yukon News has
been the recipient of several national and regional awards
for its reporting, photography, design, and layout.

The paper was originally printed in broadsheet format, but switched to tabloid format during the 1980s.

The Yukon News was bought in August 2013 by BlackPress. Its previous owner was Stephen Robertson. Gabrielle Plonka is the paper's editor.

References

External links 
Yukon News

Newspapers published in Yukon
Weekly newspapers published in Canada
Mass media in Whitehorse
Publications established in 1960